Hall Run is a  long 3rd order tributary to the Youghiogheny River in Fayette County, Pennsylvania.

Variant names
According to the Geographic Names Information System, it has also been known historically as:
Hall's Run
Halls Run

Course
Hall Run rises at Fiketown, Pennsylvania, and then flows easterly to join the Youghiogheny River in Youghiogheny River Lake at Somerfield.

Watershed
Hall Run drains  of area, receives about 48.3 in/year of precipitation, has a wetness index of 350.05, and is about 72% forested.

See also
List of rivers of Pennsylvania

References

Tributaries of the Youghiogheny River
Rivers of Pennsylvania
Rivers of Fayette County, Pennsylvania